Cosmioneis is a genus of diatoms belonging to the family Cosmioneidaceae.

Species:

Cosmioneis brasiliana 
Cosmioneis capitata 
Cosmioneis citriformis

References

Naviculales
Diatom genera